First Expedition is a 1988 video game published by Interstel Corporation.

Gameplay
First Expedition is a game in which a nautical simulation involves a quest to find three sun spheres that were stolen from the island of Shandola.

Reception
Dennis Owens reviewed the game for Computer Gaming World, and stated that "Not recommended for adventure gamers unless they are interested in intricate navigational techniques."

Reviews
Computer Gaming World - Nov, 1992

References

1988 video games
Action-adventure games
DOS games
DOS-only games
Naval video games
Science fiction video games
Vehicle simulation games
Video games developed in the United States
Video games set in outer space
Video games set on fictional islands
Video games set on fictional planets